Brilhante is a surname. Notable people with the surname include:

Alfredo Brilhante da Costa (1904–1980), Brazilian footballer
Carlos Alberto Brilhante Ustra (1932–2015), Brazilian army colonel and politician
Isabel Brilhante Pedrosa (born 1964), Portuguese diplomat
Robson José Brilhante Martins (born 1998), Brazilian footballer

Other uses
Brilhante (TV series), a 1981 Brazilian telenovela
Brilhante F.C., a 2011 Brazilian teen drama series
Brilhante River, a river in southwestern Brazil